The Black Bloc was a political organisation in Sudan which sought to defend the interests of Black Sudanese. The Black Bloc emerged in 1948 and was active throughout the colonial period. It was based in the Nuba Mountains. The Black Bloc faced resistance from other Sudanese political parties, who labelled it as a "racist" organisation. The British colonial authorities caved in to the pressure from these groups, and denied the Black Bloc the ability to register itself as a political party.

References

Black political parties
Defunct political parties in Sudan